Allahverdi Khan (died 1662) was a Safavid military officer of Armenian origin. He was the son of a certain Khosrow Khan, and had a brother named Emamverdi Beg.

Sources 

 
  
 
 
 
 
 
 

1662 deaths
Year of birth unknown
Safavid military officers
Persian Armenians
Ethnic Armenian Shia Muslims
Safavid ghilman
17th-century births
Safavid governors of Astarabad
Safavid governors of Kuhgiluyeh
Qollar-aghasi
Masters of the hunt of the Safavid Empire
17th-century people of Safavid Iran
Safavid slaves